London Knowledge Lab was a research centre in Bloomsbury, London. It was founded in 2004 as a collaboration between the Institute of Education and Birkbeck, University of London. It was an interdisciplinary research centre, bringing together over 50 researchers from both social sciences and computer science backgrounds. The Institute of Education and Birkbeck announced the end of their collaboration in February 2016. Both institutions are continuing the work in their own separate Knowledge Lab research centres.

Funding

The London Knowledge Lab was mainly funded by £6 million grant from the Science Research Investment Fund. In addition, it ran over 120 research projects, funded by a variety of funding bodies, including EPSRC, ESRC, Jisc, and the EU, amongst others. The Technology Enhanced Learning research programme, a major UK educational research programme, was directed from the Knowledge Lab.

Research themes

Research at London Knowledge Lab focused upon three themes:
Automating support for learning, collaboration and knowledge building
Understanding how digital technologies and media affect educational practice, work, culture and society
Developing innovative methodologies for investigation of the use and effect of digital technologies

References

External links 
 London Knowledge Lab website
 TLRP-TEL website - the Teaching and Learning Research Programme Technology-Enhanced Learning phase is run from the London Knowledge Lab

University College London
UCL Institute of Education
Birkbeck, University of London
Educational technology research centers
Research institutes in London
Science and technology in London